Jon Bautista Orgilles (born 3 July 1995) is a Spanish professional footballer who plays as a striker for SD Eibar.

Club career

Real Sociedad
Bautista was born in Mahón, Menorca, Balearic Islands, but moved to Errenteria, Gipuzkoa, Basque Country at a young age. He was a Real Sociedad youth graduate after starting out at Touring KE, and was promoted to the former's reserve team in Segunda División B on 23 June 2014 having made several appearances in that season's UEFA Youth League.

Bautista made his senior debut on 23 August 2014, coming on as a late substitute for Eneko Capilla in a 3–3 home draw against UB Conquense in the Segunda División B. He scored his first senior goal on 27 September, netting the first in a 4–0 home rout of CD Guadalajara.

On 25 February 2016, Bautista renewed his contract until 2020. He appeared in his first competitive match – and in La Liga – on 24 April, replacing fellow youth graduate Mikel Oyarzabal in the dying minutes of a 0–0 away draw against Villarreal CF.

Bautista scored his first professional goal on 8 May 2016, the winner in a 2–1 home win over Rayo Vallecano. Ahead of the 2017–18 season, he was definitively promoted to the main squad.

On 11 July 2019, after being used mainly as a backup to Willian José, Bautista was loaned to Belgian club K.A.S. Eupen for one year. On 3 April 2021, he did not leave the bench for Real in the delayed 2020 Copa del Rey Final against Athletic Bilbao, which ended in a 1–0 victory.

On 26 August 2021, Bautista moved to Segunda División side CD Leganés on a one-year loan deal.

Eibar
On 22 July 2022, Bautista signed a three-year contract with SD Eibar.

Personal life
Bautista's uncle, José María, was also a footballer. A left back, he too was groomed at Real Sociedad.

Career statistics

Honours
Real Sociedad
Copa del Rey: 2019–20

References

External links
Real Sociedad official profile

1995 births
Living people
People from Mahón
People from Errenteria
Sportspeople from Gipuzkoa
Spanish footballers
Footballers from Menorca
Footballers from the Basque Country (autonomous community)
Association football forwards
La Liga players
Segunda División players
Segunda División B players
Real Sociedad B footballers
Real Sociedad footballers
CD Leganés players
SD Eibar footballers
Belgian Pro League players
K.A.S. Eupen players
Basque Country international footballers
Spanish expatriate footballers
Expatriate footballers in Belgium
Spanish expatriate sportspeople in Belgium